Ryhill railway station was situated on the Barnsley Coal Railway, later the MS&L, Great Central and London and North Eastern Railway.

History
The station opened for passenger traffic on 1 September 1882. It was renamed Ryhill and Wintersett on 1 March 1927 and closed by the LNER on 22 February 1930.

The station consisted of two flanking wooden platforms with wooden buildings, the main buildings being on the Barnsley bound side, and a signal box just off the end of the Barnsley - bound platform. The platforms were linked by a standard footbridge.

Another station, Ryhill Halt, served the village on the Dearne Valley Railway from 1912 to 1951, about half a mile to the south-east.

Accidents and incidents
On 13 December 1911, a freight train was derailed at the station due to the locomotive crew being incapacitated.

References 

Source
Railways around Wakefield and Pontefract, John Farline and Peter Cookson, Wyvern Publications.

External links
 Wintersett station on navigable 1947 O. S. map

Disused railway stations in Wakefield
Railway stations in Great Britain opened in 1882
Railway stations in Great Britain closed in 1930
Former Great Central Railway stations